Tadao Ishihata (born 6 October 1941) is a Japanese speed skater. He competed in two events at the 1968 Winter Olympics.

References

External links
 

1941 births
Living people
Japanese male speed skaters
Olympic speed skaters of Japan
Speed skaters at the 1968 Winter Olympics
Sportspeople from Tochigi Prefecture
20th-century Japanese people
21st-century Japanese people